Trupanea convergens is a species of tephritid or fruit flies in the genus Trupanea of the family Tephritidae.

Distribution
Mongolia, Eastern Russia, China, Malaysia, Philippines.

References

Tephritinae
Insects described in 1936
Diptera of Asia